Hugh Douglas Barclay (July 5, 1932 – March 14, 2021) was an American lawyer, an 11-term New York State Senator, and a United States Ambassador to El Salvador.

Personal life
Barclay was born on July 5, 1932, in New York City and moved to Pulaski, Oswego County, New York. He attended Pulaski Academy and Central Schools and later attended St. Paul's School. He graduated BA from Yale University in 1955, and went on to serve in the United States Army for two years. He earned a J.D. from Syracuse University College of Law in 1961. He married Sara J. "Dee Dee" Seiter, and they have five children, among them Assemblyman Will Barclay (born 1969).

Barclay died on March 14, 2021, at the age of 88.

Career
From 1961 until 2003, Barclay served as a partner for the upstate New York law firm of Hiscock & Barclay, a law firm specializing in Banking and Administrative Law. He also entered politics as a Republican.

He was a member of the New York State Senate from 1965 to 1984, sitting in the 175th, 176th, 177th, 178th, 179th, 180th, 181st, 182nd, 183rd, 184th, and 185th New York State Legislatures. During this long tenure, he was a chair of Senate Codes Committee, Senate Judiciary Committee, the Select Task Force on Court Reorganization, and the Senate Republican (Majority) Conference. He was responsible for over 500 pieces of legislation.

Between 1990 to 1993, Barclay was appointed a public board member of the Overseas Private Investment Corporation by President George H. W. Bush.

Barclay's appointment as Ambassador to El Salvador by George W. Bush was announced August 21, 2003, and the nomination was sent to the Senate for confirmation on September 15. The Senate confirmed the nomination on October 3. He was sworn in as ambassador on November 12, and presented his credentials to El Salvador's President, Francisco Flores, on December 18. He completed his tour as ambassador in July 2006.

Barclay received many awards including Clarkson University's Bertrand S. Snell Award (1987), St. Lawrence University Distinguished Service Award (1985), and the SUNY Potsdam's North Country Citation (1985), the El Salvadorian National Congress award of the Nobel Amigo de El Salvador (2006), and the Republic of El Salvador award of the Order of José Matías Delgado in 2007.

Syracuse University
Barclay was an influential leader at Syracuse University. He served as SU Trustee since 1979 until 2007, and was the chair of the Board from 1992 to 1998. He was also a member of the College of Law Advisory Board.

In 1984, he received the George Arents Award Pioneer Medal, the University's highest alumni honor, for Excellence in Law and Public Service. In 1985, the law library at the Syracuse University College of Law was named in his honor. He also received an honorary degree from SU in 1998.

Sources

1932 births
2021 deaths
Ambassadors of the United States to El Salvador
Republican Party New York (state) state senators
People from Pulaski, New York
St. Paul's School (New Hampshire) alumni
Syracuse University College of Law alumni
Syracuse University trustees
Yale University alumni